Bowes & Bowes was a bookselling and publishing company based in Cambridge, England. It was established by Robert Bowes (1835–1919), a nephew of Daniel Macmillan (1813–1857) — the founder, with his brother Alexander, of a firm which by 1850 was a thriving bookshop with the official name ‘’ The same bookshop was eventually owned by Alexander Macmillan in partnership with Robert Bowes. The company became known as ‘’ only , George Brimley Bowes (1874-1946, Robert Bowes’ son) having become  a partner in the business . In that year the business’s name was changed to Sherratt & Hughes.

The  site at 1, Trinity Street, Cambridge has a claim to be the oldest bookshop in the country, books having been sold there since 1581.

The firm’s backlist included titles by Erich Heller, who was also the general editor of a series of books published by Bowes & Bowes (Studies in Modern European Literature and Thought, some of which were printed in the Netherlands).

Sherratt & Hughes
In 1898 John Sherratt and Joseph David Hughes opened a bookshop in Manchester. Sherratt was in charge of the printing and publishing, whilst Hughes was in charge of selling books. In 1905 Sherratt & Hughes owned a bookshop at 27 St. Ann Street in Manchester and another shop at 65 Long Acre in London. Before 1913 Sherratt & Hughes did printing and distribution for the University of Manchester and the Publications Committee of the University. Sherratt & Hughes was taken over by W H Smith in 1946; in April 1992 the subsidiary Sherratt & Hughes ceased to operate.

See also
 Macmillan Publishers (on the Macmillan brothers)
 Our Price (on the subject of Sherratt & Hughes)
 W. H. Smith & Son
 Book trade in the United Kingdom
 Books in the United Kingdom

References

External links
Bowes & Bowes book labels
National Archives
Robert Bowes
CUP

1581 establishments in England
Book publishing companies of the United Kingdom
Companies based in Cambridge
History of Cambridge
Mass media companies disestablished in 1986
Bookshops of England
Publishing companies established in the 16th century
Organizations established in the 1580s